This is the list of serving Admirals of the Pakistan Navy. At present, the Navy has 1 Admiral (Chief of the Naval Staff (CNS)), 3 Vice Admirals, 28 Rear Admirals and 3 Local Rear Admirals.

List of designated and active Four-Star Officers

List of designated and active Three-Star Officers

List of designated and active Two-Star Officers

List of designated and active Local Two-Star Officers
Local rank: A higher rank awarded to a person temporarily when serving and restricted to service in a particular region or location. The seniority is never considered in this rank as they are not promoted officially and without the signed approval of Prime Minister of Pakistan thus remaining the most junior two star officers in service with the payscale of previous rank.

See also
List of serving Generals of the Pakistan Army
List of serving Air Marshals of the Pakistan Air Force

References

External links
 Pakistan Navy (Official website)

Admirals
Pakistan
 
Admirals
Pakistan Navy